Peter Jørgensen Gram (25 November 1881 – 4 February 1956) was a Danish composer and organist.

Gram was born in Copenhagen and studied at the Leipzig Conservatory under Stephan Krehl, Arthur Nikisch and Hans Sitt. From 1908, he worked as a conductor in Copenhagen, and from 1918 to 1932, he led the performances of the Dansk Koncertforening. From 1937 to 1951 he was Director of Music at the Danish Broadcasting Corporation.

He composed three symphonies, a symphonic fantasy, a tone poem, two overtures, a violin concerto, chamber works, piano works and songs.

References

External links 
 DACAPOS webpage
 Ejnar Jacobsen og Vagn Kappel: Musikken mestre b. 2 (1947)
 Gram's grave

Danish composers
Male composers
Danish classical organists
Male classical organists
1881 births
1956 deaths
20th-century organists
20th-century Danish male musicians